Kutisha is a rural locality (a selo) in Levashinsky District, Republic of Dagestan, Russia. The population was 1,922 as of 2010. There are 22 streets.

Geography 
Kutisha is located 6 km west of Levashi (the district's administrative centre) by road. Levashi and Kakamakhi are the nearest rural localities.

Nationalities 
Avars live there.

References 

Rural localities in Levashinsky District